Citizens Insurance Co of Canada v Parsons is a major Canadian constitutional case decided by the Judicial Committee of the Privy Council, at that time the highest court of appeal for the British Empire. The case decided a significant issue of the division of powers between the federal Parliament and the provincial legislatures. The approach taken to provincial power, as advocated by Premier Oliver Mowat of Ontario, began to set the constitutional framework for broad provincial powers and a reduction in the centralist vision of Confederation espoused by Prime Minister John A. Macdonald.

At issue was the scope of provincial legislative jurisdiction over property and civil rights under s. 92(13) of the British North America Act, 1867 (now the Constitution Act, 1867) compared to the federal power over trade and commerce under s. 91(2). The Judicial Committee held that the provincial power included regulating individual business contracts, in this case insurance contracts, while the federal trade and commerce power related to matters that affected Canada as a whole, but did not extend to regulating particular businesses.

Although the point in issue was a matter of insurance law, the constitutional aspect of the decision was far-reaching.  The Judicial Committee decision rejected a broad interpretation of the federal trade and commerce power, and established a substantial reading of the provincial property and civil rights power.  

The case continues to be regularly cited by the Supreme Court of Canada in division of powers cases.

Factual background
There were three separate court cases which were tried separately, but heard together on appeal by the Supreme Court of Canada, as they raised the same constitutional issue.

William Parsons was the owner of a hardware store in Orangeville, Ontario, covered by an insurance policy provided by Citizens' Insurance Company of Canada. At the time the policy was issued, he had a similar policy in effect with the Western Assurance Company. When the store burnt down in a fire in August 1877, Citizens' Insurance refused to pay on the basis that the nondisclosure of the Western policy violated the terms of its policy, and also breached a statutory condition, under Ontario's Fire Insurance Policy Act. Parsons sued to collect on the policy and contended that it did not comply with the presentation requirements of the provincial Act.

Parsons also had an insurance policy with Queen Insurance Company.  When he claimed on that insurance policy for the fire, Queen Insurance refused to pay for a number of reasons, including the same argument that there was an undisclosed contract for insurance with another company.

The third case involved Ellen Johnston, who held a policy of insurance with the Western Assurance Company, which refused to pay on the basis that they had been incorporated by the former Province of Canada and continued under federal legislation, and therefore were not required to comply with the provincial Fire Insurance Act.

In addition, all three companies had been authorised to carry out the business of fire insurance by licences issued under federal law relating to fire insurance companies.

Ontario court decisions

Trial decisions
The three cases were tried separately in the Ontario Court of Queen's Bench.  In all three cases, the Queen's Bench entered a verdict in favour of the insured, against the insurance companies.  In each case, the court ruled that the provincial Fire Insurance Act applied and prevented the insurance companies from raising the arguments regarding non-compliance with terms of the insurance policies.  The Fire Insurance Act set out mandatory terms that had to be included in all policies, which the insurance companies had not done.  Failure to do so meant that they could not rely on the restrictive clauses in the policies.

Ontario Court of Appeal
The three insurance companies then appealed to the Ontario Court of Appeal. Since all three companies were trying to rely on clauses in their policies that did not comply with the Ontario Fire Insurance Act, they all challenged the constitutionality of that Act.   Citizens' Insurance argued that the provincial law did not apply to it, since it was incorporated by a federal statute and governed by federal insurance law.  Queen Insurance argued that since it was incorporated under English law, a provincial law could not restrict its contracts.  Western Assurance argued that since it had been incorporated by the former Province of Canada, and continued under federal law, it was not subject to the provincial law.

In each case, the Court of Appeal rejected the arguments of the insurance companies and ruled in favour of Parsons and Johnston.

Supreme Court of Canada

Counsel and arguments
The three insurance companies then appealed to the Supreme Court of Canada. They were represented by Christopher Robinson, QC, James Bethune, and J.T. Small.  The respondents, Parsons and Johnston, were represented by Dalton McCarthy, QC.  Premier Oliver Mowat, QC, acting in his role as Attorney General of Ontario, intervened to argue for the constitutionality of the provincial Fire Insurance Act. 

Counsel for the insurance companies challenged the constitutionality of the provincial statute on two main grounds:  (1) the business of insurance was within the exclusive jurisdiction of the federal Parliament, as a matter of "trade and commerce", assigned to Parliament by s. 91(2) of the Constitution Act, 1867, and therefore beyond provincial authority; and (2) the insurance companies were incorporated by the federal government or under British law, and authorised by their corporate charters to carry on the business of fire insurance, so provincial laws could not restrict their contracts of insurance.

Counsel for Parsons and Johnstone, and the Attorney General for Ontario, argued that contracts are a well-established example of "property and civil rights", under Canadian law and also under English law.  The federal power to regulate trade and commerce applies to Canada as a whole, but does not take the law of contract out of provincial jurisdiction.  The provincial law regulating the terms of fire insurance contracts was a matter of "property and civil rights" under s. 92(13) of the Constitution Act, 1867, and also a purely local matter, under s. 92(16).  None of the corporate charters tried to make them immune from provincial law.  As well, the provincial law in question was designed not to benefit insurance companies, but to protect the residents of the province to ensure fair term of insurance.  Within the matters assigned to them the provinces have sovereign powers to legislate as fully and amply as they deem fit.

Decision of the Supreme Court
The Court dismissed the appeals of the three insurance companies, by a majority of 4 to 2.  The Court ruled:

The Fire Insurance Policy Act was not ultra vires provincial jurisdiction and applied to all insurance companies that insured property within the province.
The Act was not a regulation of trade and commerce under s. 91(2) of the British North America Act, 1867.
Insurers in Ontario had to comply with the statutory conditions imposed under the Fire Insurance Policy Act.  Failure to do so meant that the insurance company could not rely on restrictions on coverage set out in the Act.

As was the practice at that time, each judge wrote their own reasons, except for Justice Strong, who concurred with the majority.

Ritchie CJ asserted that the regulation of insurance contracts fell under the provincial property and civil rights power:

Henri Elzéar Taschereau and John Wellington Gwynne, who dissented in the Supreme Court decision, advised Prime Minister John A. Macdonald to consider intervening if necessary to have the decision appealed to the Judicial Committee of the Privy Council. In particular, Gwynne said:

Citizens' Insurance appealed to the Privy Council, and Mowat asserted his influence on the case by having the province assume Parson's costs and by briefing his lawyers to argue that the provincial legislative jurisdiction should be broadly defined, and the federal government could not encroach upon it.

At the Privy Council

The Supreme Court ruling was affirmed. The Queen's Bench verdict was reversed, however, because of outstanding questions as to the interpretation of certain interim notes and the matter was remitted back to that court for reconsideration.

British Judge Montague Smith noted as a general proposition that the British North America Act, 1867 must be interpreted as an ordinary statute.

Trade and Commerce
The case largely turned on the issue of the law overlapping two heads of power. Smith focused on interpreting the Trade and Commerce power; he famously stated:

In all, Smith established three characteristics of the trade and commerce power:

The "regulation of trade and commerce" should not be read literally.
It includes international and interprovincial trade as well as "general regulation of trade affecting the whole dominion."
It does not extend to regulate contracts between businesses.

Incorporation of federal companies
Taschereau J, in his opinion, had expressed concern that if the Parliament of Canada did not possess the power to regulate companies under the trade and commerce power, it did not have the power to incorporate companies either. Smith declared that the federal incorporation power arose from s. 91's introductory words:

S. 92(11) gave the provincial legislatures power over "The Incorporation of Companies with Provincial Objects" so Smith declared:

However, the power to incorporate does not confer the exclusive right to regulate contracts.

Aftermath
Parsons had constitutional and political consequences:

It circumscribed the influence of Taschereau and Gwynne JJ's highly centralist views in Canadian constitutional jurisprudence.
It significantly restricted the federal trade and commerce power for decades in Privy Council jurisprudence, which started to transform only in the 1970s, beginning with Caloil Inc. v. Canada and seeing change in General Motors of Canada Ltd. v. City National Leasing.
It represented a major victory in Mowat's championing of increased provincial rights, which received further support in forthcoming Privy Council appeals in other cases. They still influence Canadian political and constitutional debate.

Notes

References

Further reading
 
 

1881 in Canadian case law
Canadian federalism case law
Judicial Committee of the Privy Council cases on appeal from Canada